Isaiah Johnson may refer to:
Isaiah Johnson (American football, born May 1992), NFL safety who played college at Georgia Tech
Isaiah Johnson (American football, born October 1992), NFL safety who played college at Kansas and South Carolina
Isaiah Johnson (cornerback) (born 1995), American football cornerback
Isaiah Johnson (basketball) (born 1994), American basketball player